Little Tin God may refer to:

"Little Tin God", song by Don Henley from The End of the Innocence
"Little Tin God", an episode of the television show Highlander